Kang o Risheh (also Romanized as Kang o Rīsheh) is a village in Fedagh Rural District, in the Central District of Gerash County, Fars Province, Iran. At the 2016 census, its population was 438, in 91 families.

References 

Populated places in Gerash County